Pueyrredón is a station on Line D of the Buenos Aires Underground. The station will have combinations with Line H at Santa Fe.

The station was opened on 23 February 1940 as part of the extension of Line D from Tribunales to Palermo.

Gallery

Nearby
 Santa Fe Avenue

References

External links

Buenos Aires Underground stations
1940 establishments in Argentina